The Monhysterida are an order in the phylum Nematoda. Usually the stoma in Monhysterida is funnel shaped and lightly cuticularized, but it is sometimes spacious and heavily cuticularized and they always have protrusible teeth. They are either simply spiral or circular. This worm is marine.

References

External links
 accessscience
 

Parasitic nematodes
Chromadorea
Nematode orders